Prostrate pigweed is a common name for several plants and may refer to:

Amaranthus albus
Amaranthus blitoides